Laodice II (lived in the 3rd century BC), was the wife of Seleucus II Callinicus. According to the express statement of Polybius, she was the sister of Andromachus and therefore the aunt of her husband. Laodice II bore Seleucus II Seleucus III Ceraunus and Antiochus III the Great.

References

Citations

Sources

3rd-century BC Greek people
3rd-century BC women
Seleucid royal consorts